Vokány is a village in Baranya County, Hungary. Until the end of World War II, the inhabitants were Danube Swabians, also called locally as Stifolder, because their ancestors once came around 1720 from Fulda (district). Mostly the former German settlers were expelled to Allied-occupied Germany and Allied-occupied Austria in 1945–1948, about the Potsdam Agreement.
Only a few Germans of Hungary live there, the majority today are the descendants of Hungarians from the Czechoslovak–Hungarian population exchange. They obtained the houses of the former Danube Swabians inhabitants.

References

Populated places in Baranya County